LG Cup World Baduk Championship (Korean: LG배 세계기왕전, Hanja: LG杯 世界棋王戰) is a Go competition.

Outline 
The LG Cup is organized by the Chosun Ilbo newspaper and sponsored by the LG Group of Korea. The LG Cup was created after the Kiwang (기왕; 棋王) title from Korea was abolished. There are 16 players who compete in a preliminary, and another 16 players are invited. The latest edition had 256 competitors in the preliminary, the biggest in history. The players are invited from the following Weiqi/Go/Baduk associations.

2 from the holder and runner-up of the previous year.
6 from  South Korea
3 from  Japan
3 from  China
1 from  Chinese Taipei
1 wildcard

The final is a best-of-three match. The komi is 6.5 points, and each player has 3 hours main time and five 40-second byoyomi periods. The winner's purse is 300,000,000 won and the total prize pool is 1.3 billion won.

Winners & runners-up

By nation

References

 
LG Sports